Michael Kenneth Moore    (28 January 1949 – 2 February 2020) was a New Zealand politician, union organiser, and author. In the Fourth Labour Government he served in several portfolios including minister of foreign affairs, and was the 34th prime minister of New Zealand for 59 days before the 1990 general election elected a new parliament. Following Labour's defeat in that election, Moore served as Leader of the Opposition until the 1993 election, after which Helen Clark successfully challenged him for the Labour Party leadership.

Following his retirement from New Zealand politics, Moore was Director-General of the World Trade Organization from 1999 to 2002. He also held the post of New Zealand Ambassador to the United States from 2010 to 2015.

Early life
Moore was born in 1949 in Whakatāne, Bay of Plenty Region, New Zealand, the son of Audrey Evelyn (née Goodall) and Alan George Moore. 

He was raised in Moerewa and while aged only two his mother pushed him around town in a pram which concealed Labour Party leaflets, which had been made illegal under the emergency powers enacted during the 1951 waterfront dispute. His father died when he was five years old after which he moved to Dilworth School as a boarder. He was then educated at Bay of Islands College before leaving school at 14 to  work as a labourer and then as a printer. 

He became an active trade unionist and at the age of 17 was elected to the Auckland Trades Council. He became the first youth representative on the Labour Party executive and was vice-president of the International Union of Socialist Youth for two consecutive terms. 

In 1975, he married Yvonne Dereany, a teacher and presenter of the children's television programme Romper Room.

Political career

Member of Parliament

Following the announcement of Norman Douglas' retirement from the safe  seat there was much speculation that Moore would seek the Auckland Central nomination. The media considered Moore one of the most able backbenchers in the Labour Party, however Moore decided to stand in the marginal Eden seat once again. However Moore declined wishing to remain in Eden to show confidence in Labour and its new leader Bill Rowling's ability to win the election.

After his election loss in Eden, the Moores visited Warren Freer, and were insistent that he resign from  so that Moore could take his place. Freer (who retired in 1981) said he had no intention of resigning and further stated there was no guarantee that he would be selected to replace Freer. Moore also developed cancer and had to have surgery to remove cancerous growths. He concealed this from the public fearing he would never win nomination for a seat if his condition was revealed.

Moore was then elected Labour's youth vice-president and proceeded to contest the Labour nomination in the 1977 Mangere by-election following the resignation of Colin Moyle. He was seen as a frontrunner but lost to local lawyer David Lange, who would go on to become Prime Minister in 1984. Several months later Moore then sought to be Labour's candidate in the newly formed Papatoetoe electorate but again missed out on selection against Grey Lynn MP Eddie Isbey. By the time of his second rejection for a candidature in an Auckland seat he had received invitations from Labour Party organisers in 16 electorates elsewhere in New Zealand prompting him to consider moving from Auckland in order to gain re-election to Parliament.

In 1978 Moore moved to Christchurch and was selected as Labour's candidate for the north Christchurch electorate of Papanui. Expecting to lose once again (due to interference from party head office) Moore told party president and vice-president Arthur Faulkner and Joe Walding he did not want to stand in the seat and had only accepted nomination there to test the lengths that the hierarchy would go to stop him. He also told them he was intending to use his acceptance speech to tell the members and media that the party hierarchy 'could stick their nomination up their arses'. During his walk to the podium Moore changed his mind and accepted the candidature as the now relieved Faulkner and Walding looked on.

He held the electorate until his retirement in 1999: as Papanui until 1984, as Christchurch North until 1996, and as Waimakariri thereafter. Shortly after his re-election in 1978 he was elevated to Labour's shadow cabinet by leader Bill Rowling. Initially he was passed over for a position, however after fellow MP Richard Prebble refused to join the shadow cabinet, in protest of being given portfolios he did not want, it resulted in Moore taking his place. Labour leader Bill Rowling gave Moore three associate shadow portfolios Social Welfare, Health and Education before being promoted to Shadow Minister of Housing in a reshuffle in 1980 caused by the sacking of Roger Douglas. In March 1981 Moore was promoted to the front bench and was designated Shadow Minister for the Environment and Housing. In a February 1982 reshuffle he retained Housing though lost Environment but was given Customs instead.

In 1983 Moore stood for the deputy leadership of the party. In a three-way contest, in which all candidates were from Christchurch to reflect geographical proportionality, Moore won the first ballot. Lyttelton MP Ann Hercus was eliminated and on the second ballot almost all of her supporters voted for Christchurch Central MP Geoffrey Palmer, who beat Moore by one vote. Leader David Lange later expressed relief at Palmer's success thinking that Moore would have been an un-reassuring deputy due to his inherent ambition. Nevertheless, Lange saw fit to promote Moore to number 3 in the party rankings and appointed him shadow minister of overseas trade and tourism.

Cabinet minister
As a government minister in the Fourth Labour Government he held numerous portfolios, initially as Minister of Overseas Trade, Minister of Tourism and Minister for Sport and Recreation. He became best known in his role as Overseas Trade Minister from 1984 to 1990 with involvement in the GATT negotiations. He also advanced the Closer Economic Relations (CER) free trade agreement with Australia. In 1988 he became Minister of External Relations and Deputy Minister of Finance. Moore was privately critical of the government’s asset sales agenda, particularly concerned with the surge in unemployment that followed, he even dry-vomited in a toilet after the sale of the Tourist Hotel Corporation. He was also vehemently opposed to finance minister Roger Douglas' proposal for a flat tax rate.

In 1988 Lange recalled Palmer from overseas to be acting Prime Minister to prevent Moore (who was ranked third in cabinet) doing so. Lange later reflected saying "But God alone knew what Moore might do." Moore later said he found the comments to be quite hurtful. When Lange resigned in 1989, Moore stood for the leadership of the party, but was defeated 41 votes to 19 by Palmer. Palmer did give Moore the coveted position of Minister of Foreign Affairs in early 1990. However, Palmer was unable to regain public popularity and resigned just over a year after becoming leader. Moore stood again for the leadership and this time won, defeating backbench MP Richard Northey 41 votes to 19, and consequently became New Zealand's 34th Prime Minister.

Prime Minister
Moore became Prime Minister for 60 days, having convinced the Labour caucus that, while he could not win the election for Labour, he would help save more seats than had they remained led by Palmer. Moore energetically hit the campaign trail and made an impact immediately by handling hecklers and interjectors visibly better than Palmer had done. His performance closed the gap in the polls between Labour and National to ten percent, better than it had been for over a year.

The Labour government did not return to power in the next election however. The circumstances of Moore's installment as Prime Minister would later be compared to the return of Kevin Rudd as Prime Minister of Australia. Following the loss he labelled Labour's last cabinet meeting before the changeover of government 'the last supper'. He left office on 2 November 1990.

Leader of the Opposition

He led the Official Opposition until 1993 and was spokesman on Foreign Affairs and Trade as well. He attempted a rejuvenation of Labour's ranks with several important portfolio shifts, including giving the finance portfolio to Michael Cullen, designed to blunt the growth of the newly formed Alliance party (which was made up largely of Labour dissidents). He then led Labour in the  where he managed to gain 16 seats, coming within two seats of clinching an unlikely victory just three years after the landslide 1990 defeat. On the night of the 1993 election he delivered a televised speech (dubbed the "long, cold night" speech) later described by political scientist Jack Vowles as "damaging" and "more appropriate for a decisive Labour win than a narrow defeat."

Moore said he was pleased with the result, thinking Labour was back in striking distance of forming a government in the future, and believed the result might give him a chance to retain the leadership. However he was deposed as leader at the first post-election caucus meeting by his deputy Helen Clark. His replacement did not surprise him, but he felt begrudged that he was given little appreciation, thinking he would "... have got thanks – then axed [but] the axe went before even 'thank yous'." The irony was not lost on Moore that Clark's allies had installed candidates in the seats Labour had picked up from his campaign who then voted to replace him, making his success the architect of his own downfall.

Backbencher
Moore declined any portfolios offered to him by Clark when she assembled her shadow cabinet, opting to sit on the backbench instead, frequently sniping at Clark in the house. After the 1993 referendum to adopt mixed-member proportional representation (MMP) Moore considered forming a break-away party, the New Zealand Democratic Coalition, for the 1996 MMP election, but then decided against it. He received countless letters in support of a new party, but despite his ousting as leader, he felt too much affinity to the Labour Party to ever leave it. He won his seat in the 1996 election, obtaining more than twice as many votes as the next-highest candidate, National's Jim Gerard.

Also after losing the leadership, Moore defended the record Fourth Labour Government and was critical of subsequent leaders of the party denigrating its record. He thought that Clark and Cullen's semi-repudiation of Rogernomics was conducted purely to make themselves look better and labelled their remembrances as 'manufactured history'. Clark performed poorly in opinion polls after becoming leader and by early 1996 there was an active movement within Labour to replace her either with Moore or frontbencher Phil Goff. Clark stared down the challengers and remained leader when Cullen shifted his allegiance to Clark after becoming deputy leader. Moore, who still held leadership ambitions, refused to comment on the positional change, saying only that he did not contest the deputy leadership because he was "a leader, not a deputy" but was eventually promoted to the frontbench by Clark in a surprise move. In September 1996 Moore accepted Clark's long-standing offer of the position of Shadow Minister of Foreign Affairs and Overseas Trade, saying he could no longer stay "on the sidelines".

Political positions held

 Member of Parliament for Eden, 1972–75.
 Member of Parliament for Waimakariri (formerly Papanui and Christchurch North), 1978–99.
 Minister of Tourism, Sport and Recreation, 1984–87.
 Chairman of the Cabinet Economic Development and Employment Committee, 1984–90.
 Minister of External Relations and Trade, 1988–90.
 Minister for the America's Cup, 1988–90.
 Deputy Minister of Finance, 1988–90.
 Minister of Overseas Trade and Marketing, 1984–90.
 Prime Minister of New Zealand, 1990.
 Leader of the New Zealand Labour Party, 1990–93.
 Leader of the Opposition, 1990–93.
 Opposition Spokesperson on Foreign Affairs and Overseas Trade, 1996–99.

World Trade Organization
Moore was Director-General of the World Trade Organization from 1999 to 2002. This was the highest ever ranking job in international bureaucracy held by a New Zealander. The deal with his rival and successor Supachai Panitchpakdi meant that he served only half of the usual six-year term in the post. Moore's term coincided with momentous changes in the global economy and multilateral trading system. He attempted to restore confidence in the system following the setback of the 1999 WTO ministerial conference held in Seattle. Ministers at the 2001 ministerial conference in Doha, Qatar, regarded him as the driving force behind the decision to launch a new round of multilateral trade negotiations—the ill-fated Doha Development Round. That 2001 meeting also saw the successful accession to the WTO of China and Taiwan, which along with Estonia, Jordan, Georgia, Albania, Oman, Croatia, Lithuania and Moldova joined during Moore's term, bringing the majority of the world's population within the rules-based trading system. He gave particular attention to helping poor countries participate effectively in the multilateral trading system.

Later life and death
Moore became New Zealand Ambassador to the United States in 2010. He had a heart valve operation in 2014 and was admitted to hospital in Washington DC in April 2015 after a mild stroke. In November 2015, he announced that he would leave his post on 16 December and return to New Zealand due to his deteriorating health.

Moore was a supporter of the Campaign for the Establishment of a United Nations Parliamentary Assembly.

Moore died at his home in Auckland on 2 February 2020, aged 71.

International services and appointments
 Commissioner, United Nations Commission on the Legal Empowerment of the Poor
 Commissioner, Global Commission on International Migration
 Director General of the World Trade Organization, 1999–2002
 Member, Global Leadership Foundation
 Senior Counsellor, Fonterra
 Member, Trilateral Commission
 Member, Economic Development Board, South Australia
 New Zealand Government Trade Envoy
 Special Advisor to the United Nations Global Compact for Business and Development
 Former Board Member to the Gottlieb Duttweiler Institute
 Member, Board of Governors for the Institute for International Business, Economics and Law, University of Adelaide
 Adjunct Professor, La Trobe University, Melbourne, Australia
 Adjunct Professor, University of Adelaide, South Australia
 Chairperson, Advisory Board of Carnegie Mellon University, Adelaide
 Honorary Professor, Beijing Normal University, Zhuhai
 Honorary Professor, Chinese University for Political Science and International Law, Beijing
 Honorary Professor, Shanghai Customs College
 Honorary President, Beijing Afforestation Foundation.
 Special Advisor, China Institute for Reform and Development's World Trade Organization Reference Centre.
 CEO, The Moore Group International Ltd.

Publications

Moore is an author of a number of books, on subjects ranging from politics to the Pacific. His book A World Without Walls has been published in Chinese and Turkish. He had a regular newspaper column that appeared in five countries.

 On Balance: a Labour Look at Regional, Community and Town Development 
 Beyond Today
 A Pacific Parliament: A Pacific Idea—an Economic and Political Community for the South Pacific (Asia Pacific Books, 1982)
 Hard Labour (Penguin Books, 1987)
Children of the Poor: How poverty could destroy New Zealand's future (Canterbury University Press, 1996)
A Brief History of the Future: Citizenship of the Millennium (Shoal Bay Press, 1998)
 A World Without Walls: Freedom, Development, Free Trade, and Global Governance (Cambridge University Press, 2003)
 Saving Globalization (Wiley, 2009)
 The Added Value Economy
 Beyond Tomorrow
 Fighting for New Zealand
 Labour of Love, New Zealand: a Nation That Can Work Again

Honours and awards

New Zealand honours
New Zealand 1990 Commemoration Medal (1990)
Order of New Zealand (1999)

Foreign honours
 Commander of the Order of the Equatorial Star (2000) – Government of Gabon
 Chancellor's Medal (Medalla Rectoral) – University of Chile
 National Order of the Ivory Coast (2002) – Government of the Ivory Coast
 Order of the Golden Heart of Kenya (2002) – Government of Kenya
 Order of Duke Branimir with Ribbon (June 2002) – Republic of Croatia
 National Honour of Georgia (July 2002) – Government of Georgia
 Medal of the Oriental Republic of Uruguay (August 2002) – Government of Uruguay – highest national honour
 Pope John Paul II Annual Medal (August 2002) – The Holy See
 Honorary Officer of the Order of Australia for service to the South Australian Government by developing initiatives in economic reform and for service to the education sector

Honorary degrees
 Honorary Doctorate in Commerce – Lincoln University, New Zealand
 Honorary Doctorate in Economics – People's University of China, Beijing
 Honorary Doctorate in Commerce – Auckland University of Technology, Auckland, New Zealand
 Honorary Doctorate in Commerce – University of Canterbury, Christchurch, New Zealand
 Honorary Doctorate in Law – La Trobe University, Melbourne, Australia

Notes

References

External links

A Talk With Mike Moore podcast interview from La Trobe University
 Photo of the Fish and Chip Brigade in 1980 in Douglas's office; Bassett, Douglas, Lange and Moore

|-

|-

|-

|-

|-

|-

|-

|-

|-

|-

1949 births
Ambassadors of New Zealand to the United States
Leaders of the Opposition (New Zealand)
2020 deaths
Members of the Order of New Zealand
New Zealand MPs for Christchurch electorates
New Zealand foreign ministers
New Zealand Labour Party MPs
New Zealand Labour Party leaders
People from Whakatāne
Prime Ministers of New Zealand
Directors-General of the World Trade Organization
New Zealand MPs for Auckland electorates
Honorary Officers of the Order of Australia
Recipients of the Order of the Golden Heart of Kenya
Recipients of the Order of Honor (Georgia)
People from Kawakawa, New Zealand
Members of the New Zealand House of Representatives
Unsuccessful candidates in the 1975 New Zealand general election
People educated at Bay of Islands College
21st-century New Zealand politicians
New Zealand members of the Privy Council of the United Kingdom
People educated at Dilworth School
20th-century New Zealand non-fiction writers
20th-century New Zealand male writers
Male non-fiction writers